Rainbow Rowell (born February 24, 1973) is an American author known for young adult and adult contemporary novels. Her young adult novels Eleanor & Park (2012), Fangirl (2013) and Carry On (2015) have been subjects of critical acclaim.

She was the writer of the 2017 revival of Marvel Comics' Runaways and is currently the writer for She-Hulk.

Career
Rowell was a columnist and ad copywriter at the Omaha World-Herald from 1995 to 2012.

After leaving her position as a columnist, Rowell began working for an ad agency and writing what would become her first published novel, Attachments, as a pastime. Rowell gave birth to her first son during this period and paused work on the manuscript for two years. The novel, a contemporary romantic comedy about a company's IT guy who falls in love with a woman whose email he has been monitoring, was published in 2011. Kirkus Reviews listed it as one of the outstanding debuts that year.

In 2013, Rowell published the young adult novel Eleanor & Park. It and her novel Fangirl were both named by The New York Times as among the best young adult fiction of the year. Eleanor & Park was also chosen by Amazon as one of the 10 best books of 2013, and as Goodreads' best young adult fiction of the year. In 2014, DreamWorks optioned Eleanor & Park, and Rowell worked on a screenplay, but in 2016, Rowell said the option timed out and the rights reverted to her. In 2019, it was announced that Picturestart had acquired the film rights, with Rowell writing the screenplay and executive producing.

Rowell's work garnered some negative attention in 2013 when a parents' group at a Minnesota high school challenged Eleanor & Park and Rowell was disinvited to a library event; a panel ultimately determined that the book could stay on library shelves. Rowell noted in an interview that the material that these parents were calling "profane" was what many kids in difficult situations realistically had to deal with, and that "when these people call Eleanor & Park an obscene story, I feel like they’re saying that rising above your situation isn’t possible."

In January 2014, Rowell signed a two-book deal with First Second to author two young adult graphic novels, the first of which will be illustrated by Faith Erin Hicks. Rowell's fourth novel, Landline, a contemporary adult novel about a marriage in trouble, was released on July 8, 2014.

In 2013 Rowell published the young adult novel Fangirl about a girl who is interested in a fictional book series about a boy mage named Simon Snow who attends a magical school called Watford.  Rowell later created a real trilogy of books based on the fictional books from Fangirl.  Her 2015 book Carry On is set as the eighth book in the series, in which Simon, in his eighth year at school, struggles to come to terms with his calling as the Chosen One meant to destroy the Insidious Humdrum, a magical force destroying the world of mages. He embarks on his quest with his best friend Penelope and his girlfriend Agatha, all the while "struggling" with Tyrannus Basilton "Baz" Grimm-Pitch, his vampire "nemesis." It is influenced by fan fiction, particularly the popularity of fan fiction of the Harry Potter series by J.K. Rowling.  Rowell's 2019 novel Wayward Son and her 2021 book Any Way the Wind Blows are also Simon Snow books.

Personal life
Rowell lives in Omaha, Nebraska, with her husband and two sons. She has a sister named Jade and a half sister, Abby, who owns a popular local coffee chain in Omaha, NE.

Bibliography

Young adult 
 Eleanor & Park (2012) 
 Fangirl (2013) 
Simon Snow Series
 Carry On (2015)
 Wayward Son (2019)
Any Way the Wind Blows (2021)

Adult 
 Attachments (2011)
 Landline (2014)

Short fiction collections 

Almost Midnight (2017): Compilation of two short stories: Midnights and Kindred Spirits.
Scattered Showers (2022)

Short fiction 
 "Midnights", My True Love Gave To Me: Twelve Holiday Stories, ed. Stephanie Perkins (2014)
 Kindred Spirits (World Book Day Edition) (2016)
The Prince and the Troll (2020)
If the Fate Allows (2021)

Comic books 
 Runaways, illustrated by Kris Anka (2017-2021)
Pumpkinheads, illustrated by Faith Erin Hicks (2019)
 She-Hulk, illustrated by Rogê Antônio (2022)

References

External links

 Rainbow Rowell's Official Website
 

Living people
21st-century American novelists
American children's writers
American women novelists
American writers of young adult literature
Place of birth missing (living people)
Writers from Nebraska
21st-century American women writers
1973 births
American women children's writers
Women writers of young adult literature
Women science fiction and fantasy writers